Jim P. Heenan (19 May 1930 – 29 October 1999) was an Australian rules footballer who played with Essendon in the Victorian Football League (VFL).

His father, also named Jim, made eight appearances for North Melbourne in 1930.

Heenan had a good debut season at Essendon, winning their award for the best first year player and also polling seven votes in the Brownlow Medal. A back pocket defender, he came off the bench in the 1957 VFL Grand Final, but played in the losing team.

References

1930 births
Australian rules footballers from Victoria (Australia)
Essendon Football Club players
1999 deaths